The Volta ao Distrito de Santarém  (Tour of Santarém District) was a multi-day road cycling race held annually in the District of Santárem, Portugal. From 2006 to 2008, it was organised as a 2.1 event on the UCI Europe Tour. The race was created in 1997 and underwent several nae changes throughout its existence.

Winners

External links
 
 Santarém Digital

Recurring sporting events established in 1997
Recurring sporting events disestablished in 2008
Cycle races in Portugal
UCI Europe Tour races
1997 establishments in Portugal
2008 disestablishments in Portugal
Spring (season) events in Portugal
Defunct cycling races in Portugal